The 1926 Wisconsin gubernatorial election was held on November 2, 1926.

Incumbent Republican Governor John J. Blaine retired to run for the U.S. Senate.

Republican nominee Fred R. Zimmerman defeated Independent Charles B. Perry,  Democratic nominee Virgil H. Cady and Socialist nominee Herman O. Kent.

Primary elections
Primary elections were held on September 7, 1926.

Democratic primary

Candidates
Virgil H. Cady, Democratic nominee for Wisconsin's 7th congressional district in 1914

Results

Republican primary

Candidates
Herman L. Ekern, incumbent Attorney General of Wisconsin
Charles B. Perry, incumbent member of the Wisconsin State Assembly
W. Stanley Smith, former Commissioner of Insurance
Fred R. Zimmerman, incumbent Secretary of State of Wisconsin

Results

Socialist primary

Candidates
Herman O. Kent, former member of the Wisconsin State Assembly

Results

Prohibition primary

Candidates
Adolph R. Bucknam, Prohibition nominee for U.S. Senate in 1922 and for Governor in 1924
David W. Emerson, Prohibition nominee for Governor in 1914
Alex McEathron, Prohibition nominee for Wisconsin's 9th congressional district in 1910

Results

General election

Candidates
Major party candidates
Virgil H. Cady, Democratic
Fred R. Zimmerman, Republican

Other candidates
Charles B. Perry, Independent
David W. Emerson, Prohibition
Herman O. Kent, Socialist
Alex Gordon, Socialist Labor

Results

References

Bibliography
 
 

1926
Wisconsin
Gubernatorial
November 1926 events